Alcithoe pseudolutea is a species of sea snail, a marine gastropod mollusk in the family Volutidae, the volutes.

Distribution
North Island, New Zealand.

References

External links

Volutidae
Gastropods described in 2005